The Harvard Graduate School of Design (GSD) is the graduate school of design at Harvard University, a private research university in Cambridge, Massachusetts. It offers master's and doctoral programs in architecture, landscape architecture, urban planning, urban design, real estate, design engineering, and design studies.

The GSD has over 13,000 alumni and has graduated many famous architects, urban planners, and landscape architects. The school is considered a global academic leader in design fields.

The GSD has the world's oldest landscape architecture program (founded in 1893) and North America's oldest urban planning program (founded in 1900). Architecture was first taught at Harvard University in 1874. The Graduate School of Design was officially established in 1936, combining the three fields of architecture, urban planning, and landscape architecture under one graduate school.

History

Architecture
Charles Eliot Norton brought the first architecture classes to Harvard University in 1874.

Urban planning and design
In 1900, the first urban planning courses were taught at Harvard University, and by 1909, urban planning courses taught by James Sturgis Pray were added to Harvard's design curriculum as part of the landscape architecture department. In 1923, a specialization in urban planning was established under the degree program of Master in Landscape Architecture. In 1929, North America's first urban planning degree (at the graduate level) was established at Harvard under short-term funding from the Rockefeller Foundation. The planning program migrated to the Graduate School of Design in 1936. Then in 1981, the then City and Regional Planning Program under John Kain ceased at the Graduate School of Design and was dispersed to the Kennedy School of Government and the Faculty of Arts and Sciences. In 1984, the Department of Urban Planning and Design was formed under Dean Gerald M. McCue with the inclusion of the Urban Design Program. Then in 1994, the Urban Planning program was officially returned to the Graduate School of Design under the aegis of Albert Carnesale, the Dean of the Kennedy School of Government, and Peter G. Rowe, the Dean of the Faculty of Design; with the first class entering in academic year 1994–1995. At the time, this program was envisioned as a physical planning program. In 2021, the Department of Urban Planning and Design assumed responsibility for a third graduate degree, the Master in Real Estate (MRE).

Landscape architecture
In 1893, the nation's first professional course in landscape architecture was offered at Harvard University. In 1900, the world's first landscape architecture program was established by Frederick Law Olmsted Jr. and Arthur A. Shurcliff. The School of Landscape Architecture was established in 1913. Lester Collins who studied there, graduating in 1942, became professor after World War II, and soon Dean of the course.

Establishment
The three major design professions (architecture, urban planning, and landscape architecture) were officially united in 1936 to form the Harvard Graduate School of Design. Joseph F. Hudnut (1886–1968) was an American architect scholar and professor who was the first dean. In 1937, Walter Gropius joined the GSD faculty as chair of the Department of Architecture and brought modern designers, including Marcel Breuer to help revamp the curriculum.

In 1960, Josep Lluís Sert established the nation's first Urban Design program. George Gund Hall, which is the present iconic home GSD, opened in 1972 and was designed by Australian architect and GSD graduate John Andrews. The school's now defunct Laboratory for Computer Graphics and Spatial Analysis (LCGSA) is widely recognized as the research/development environment from which the now-commercialized technology of geographic information systems (GIS) emerged in the late 1960s and 1970s. More recent research initiatives include the Design Robotics Group, a unit that investigates new material systems and fabrication technologies in the context of architectural design and construction.

Deans

Academics

The degrees granted in the masters programs include the Master of Architecture (MArch), Master in Landscape Architecture (MLA), Master of Architecture in Urban Design (MAUD), Master of Landscape Architecture in Urban Design (MLAUD), Master in Urban Planning (MUP), Master in Real Estate (MRE), Master in Design Engineering (MDE), Master in Design Studies (MDes). The school also offers the Doctor of Design (DDes) and jointly administers a Doctor of Philosophy (PhD) degree in architecture, urban planning, and landscape architecture with the Graduate School of Arts and Sciences.

Master of Architecture (MArch I)
Master of Architecture (MArch II) (Post-professional)
Master of Architecture in Urban Design (MAUD) (Post-professional)
Master in Urban Planning (MUP)
Master in Real Estate (MRE)
Master of Landscape Architecture (MLA)
Master in Design Engineering (MDE)
Master of Landscape Architecture in Urban Design (MLAUD)
Master in Design Studies (MDes)
Doctor of Design (DDes)
Doctor of Philosophy in Architecture, Urban Planning, and Landscape Architecture (PhD)

Rankings
As of 2016, the program's ten-year average ranking places it first, overall, on DesignIntelligence's ranking of programs accredited by the National Architectural Accrediting Board.

Executive Education
Executive Education operates within GSD providing professional development classes. The Advanced Management Development Program in Real Estate (AMDP) is a year-long executive development course open to established real estate professionals. Upon graduating from AMDP, participants are full-fledged Harvard University Alumni. Throughout the year, Executive Education offers short duration programs in the fields of architecture, urban planning, design, and real estate to a diverse audience of learners.

Student body

As of 2012–2013, there were 878 students enrolled. 362 students or 42% were enrolled in architecture, 182 students or 21% in landscape architecture, 161 students or 18% in urban planning, and 173 students or 20% in doctoral or design studies programs. Approximately, 65% of students were Americans. The average student is 27 years old. GSD students are represented by the Harvard Graduate Council (HGC), a university-wide student government organization. There are also several dozen internal GSD student clubs.

Research and publications
In addition to its degree programs, the GSD administers the Loeb Fellowship, and numerous research initiatives such as the Zofnass Program for Sustainable Infrastructure. The school publishes the bi-annual Harvard Design Magazine, Platform, and other design books and studio works.

Design Research Labs
The GSD Design Labs synthesize theoretical and applied knowledge through research with the intent to enable design to be an agent of change in society. There are seven current labs: Material Processes and Systems Group; Energy, Environments and Design; New Geographies Lab; Responsive Environments and Artifacts Lab; Social Agency Lab; Urban Theory Lab; Geometry Lab.

Campus
The GSD campus is located northeast of Harvard Yard and across the street from Memorial Hall. Gund Hall is the main building of the GSD, and it houses most of the student space and faculty offices. Other nearby buildings include space for the school's Design Research Labs, faculty offices, the Loeb Fellowship program office, and research space for students, including those in the MDes and DDes programs.

Gund Hall
Gund Hall is the main building, which has studio spaces and offices for approximately 800 students and more than 100 faculty and staff, lecture and seminar rooms, workshops and darkrooms, an audiovisual center, computer facilities, Chauhaus, the cafeteria, a project room, Piper Auditorium, and the Frances Loeb Library. The central studio space, also known as the Trays, extends through five levels under a stepped, clear-span roof. Gund Hall has a yard that comprises a basketball court and is often used for events, as an exhibition area for class projects, and as the setting for commencement ceremonies. The building was designed by architect John Andrews and supervised by structural engineer William LeMessurier both GSD alumni.

Frances Loeb Library
The Frances Loeb Library, is the main library of the Graduate School of Design. The library has a collection of over 300,000 books and journals. It also has a Materials and Visual Resources Department, and the Special Collections Department, which houses the GSD's rare books and manuscript collection.

Fabrication Lab
The Fabrication Lab has both traditional tools and state-of-the-art technology available for model making and prototyping to faculty research and student course work. The Fabrication Lab has a full wood shop, metals shop, printing labs, 3D printing, CNC tools, robotic machines, laser cutter machines, etc.

Notable alumni and faculty
 the GSD had over 13,000 alumni in 96 countries. The GSD had 77 faculty members and 129 visiting faculty members. 45% of the faculty members were born outside of the United States.

Alumni 

 Alejandro Zaera-Polo
 Alexandra Lange, critic
 Andy Fillmore, urban designer and incumbent member of the Canadian parliament for Halifax
 Anita Berrizbeitia, landscape architect and Chair of the Department of Landscape Architecture, Harvard University GSD
 Bruno Zevi, architect, critic, and historian
 John Andrews, designer of the GSD's Gund Hall
 Charles Jencks, landscape architect and architectural theorist
 Christopher Alexander, architect, co-author of A Pattern Language
 Christopher Charles Benninger, architect
 Lester Collins (landscape architect)
 Shaun Donovan (born 1966), former US Secretary of Housing and Urban Development and Director of the Office of Management and Budget, running for Mayor of New York City
 Cornelia Oberlander, landscape architect
 Dan Kiley, modernist landscape architect
 Danny Forster, architect and television host
 David Gee Cheng, engineer and real estate developer, former Indonesian Deputy Minister for City Planning and Construction
 Edward Durell Stone, Modernist architect
 Edward Durell Stone Jr., landscape architect, founder of EDSA
 Edward Larrabee Barnes, prolific Modernist architect
 Eliot Noyes
 Elizabeth Whittaker, architect, founder of Merge Architects
 Farshid Moussavi
 Frank Gehry, Pritzker Prize Laureate, awarded honorary doctorate, studied urban planning 
Frida Escobedo, Architect
 Fumihiko Maki, Pritzker Prize Laureate
 Garrett Eckbo, modernist landscape architect
 George Ranalli
 Grace La, architect
 Grant Jones, landscape architect
 Harry Seidler
 Henry N. Cobb
 Hideo Sasaki, landscape architect, former department chair, founder of Sasaki Associates and Sasaki Walker Associates
 Hugh Stubbins, architect
 Ian McHarg, landscape planner, GIS development
 IM Pei, Pritzker Prize Laureate
 Jack Dangermond, landscape architecture, GIS development, co-founder of Environmental Systems Research Institute (ESRI)
 Jeanne Gang
 John Hejduk
 Joshua Prince-Ramus
 Julian Wood Glass Jr., businessman, philanthropist
 Ken Smith (architect)，landscape architect, educator
 Kongjian Yu, landscape architect, educator, founder of Turenscape, Peking
 Lawrence Halprin, landscape architect
 Mario Torroella, architect and artist, co-founder of HMFH Architects 
 Meejin Yoon, architect and Dean of Cornell University College of Architecture, Art, & Planning
 Michael Graves
 Michael Maltzan, architect
 Michaele Pride-Wells, architect and educator
 Michel Mossessian, architect, Design Principal and Founder of mossessian & partners
 Michele Michahelles, Paris-based architect, led restoration of Les Invalides
 Mikyoung Kim, landscape architect
 Mitchell Joachim
 Monica Ponce de Leon, dean and professor, Princeton University School of Architecture; principal, MPdL Studio
 Richard T. Murphy Jr.
 Nader Tehrani (g. 1991) – Dean, The Irwin S. Chanin School of Architecture of the Cooper Union, Founding Principal of NADAAA
 Paul Rudolph
 Philip Johnson, Pritzker Prize Laureate
 Preston Scott Cohen, architect
 Robert F. Fox Jr.
 Robert Geddes, architect and Dean of Princeton School of Architecture
 Roger Montgomery, first HUD Urban Designer, dean at U.C. Berkeley
 Shaun Donovan, former Secretary of Housing and Urban Development
 Shrinkhala Khatiwada,Miss Nepal 2018
 Thom Mayne, Pritzker Prize Laureate
 William Curtis, architectural historian
 William LeMessurier, structural engineer founder of LeMessurier Consultants
 Yoshio Taniguchi

Current faculty 
Notable faculty currently at the school include Anita Berrizbeitia, Eve Blau, Sean Canty, Jennifer Bonner, Hanif Kara, Jorge Silvetti, Antoine Picon, Farshid Moussavi, Jeanne Gang, Peter G. Rowe, John R. Stilgoe, K. Michael Hays, Krzysztof Wodiczko, Martha Schwartz, Mohsen Mostafavi, Preston Scott Cohen, Rahul Mehrotra, Rem Koolhaas, Grace La, Rafael Moneo, Sarah M. Whiting, Toshiko Mori, Mark Lee, and Sharon Johnston.

Emeritus faculty 
 Alan A. Altshuler

Former faculty 
Barbara Bestor
Tatiana Bilbao
 Lester Collins (landscape architect)
 Bjarke Ingels, Visiting Professor
 Christopher Tunnard, landscape architect
 Eduard Sekler
 George Hargreaves, landscape architect
 Gerhard Kallmann, Kallmann & McKinnell, designer of Boston City Hall
 Henry N. Cobb, Pei Cobb Freed & Partners, designer of John Hancock Tower in Boston
 Hugh Stubbins, architect, designer of Citigroup Center
 J. B. Jackson, vernacular American landscape writer
 Jaqueline Tyrwhitt, 1955–1969
 Richard M. Sommer, 1998–2009 
 Jerzy Sołtan, 1959-1979
 John Wilson (sculptor)
 Josep Lluis Sert, dean of the GSD from 1953 to 1969 and often credited with being instrumental in bringing modernist architecture to the United States
 Joshua Prince-Ramus, Visiting Professor
 Philippe Rahm, Visiting Professor
 Kenneth John Conant
 Marcel Breuer
 Martin Wagner, German architect and housing expert
 Michael McKinnell, Kallmann & McKinnell, designer of Boston City Hall
 Monica Ponce de Leon
 Moshe Safdie, designer of Habitat 
 Peter Walker, landscape architect
 Rick Joy, Visiting Professor
 Serge Chermayeff, 1953–1962 
 Sigfried Giedion, author of the highly influential history Space, Time and Architecture
 Theodora Kimball Hubbard, librarian, 1911-1924
 Walter Gropius, 1937–1952; founder of Bauhaus
 Zaha Hadid, Pritzker Prize Laureate

References

External links 
 

 
Graduate School of Design
1936 establishments in Massachusetts